Anton Schneeberger (1530, Zurich - 13 March 1581, Cracow) was a Swiss botanist, doctor, and book collector based in Poland.

Life
Schneeberger began his studies at Basel under the doctor and natural scientist Conrad Gessner. He later studied at Basel, before arriving at the Jagiellonian University in Cracow in 1553. Three years later he left for France, studying at Montpellier and Paris, where he earned the title of doctor of medicine and philosophy.

In 1559 Schneeberger returned to Poland. He kept an active travel schedule, however, visiting Lithuania and spending time at the university in Königsberg. He returned to Cracow in 1561 and soon established himself among the local doctors and scholars. He counted Copernicus' student Jerzy Joachim Retyka and the German doctor and book collector Matthias Stoius among his friends.

Schneeberg married twice. His first wife, Katarzyna, daughter of the royal doctor Jan Antonin, died young in 1569. His second wife, Anna, was the daughter of the wealthy apothecary Mikołaj Alantsee. They had one son together named Anton, who later became a doctor himself. The younger Anton studied in Padua, but died relatively young.

Works
 Catalogus stirpium latine et polonine conscriptus. Cracow: drukarnia Łazarzowa, 1557.
 One of the first works about the flora local to the region of Cracow. 
 Catalogus medicamentorum simplicium sive evporiston pestilentiae ueneno aduersatium. Zürich: Gesner, 1561. Digitzed by Bayerische Staatsbibliothek.
 De multiplici salis usu libellus. Cracow: Łazarz Andrysowicz, 1562. Digitized by Dolnośląska Biblioteka Cyfrowa.
 De bona militum valetudine conservanda liber. Księga o zachowaniu dobrego zdrowia żołnierzy. Cracow: drukarnia Łazarzowa, 1564. Reprinted with additional material, Warsaw, 2008. Digitized by Bayerische Staatsbibliothek.
 Medicamentorum facile parabilium adversus omnis generis articulorum dolores enumeratio. Frankfurt: Andreas Wechelus, 1580. Digitized by Bayerische Staatsbibliothek.

See also
 Simon Syrenius, Zielnik

References

Notes

Bibliography
 Hajdukiewicz, L. "Schneeberger (Schneberger) Anton". In Polski Słownik Biograficzny, vol. 35, no. 4, pp.568-71. Cracow, 1994.
 Hryniewiecki, "B. Anton Schneeberger (1530-1581) ein Schüler Konrad Gesners in Polen". Veröffentlichungen des Geobotanischen Institutes Rübel in Zürich 13 (1938): 1-64.
 Ilnicki, S. "Życie i działalność Antoniego Schneebergera". In A. Schneeberger, De bona militum..., pp. viii-xii.
 Ilnicki, S., and R. A. Sucharski, "Zalecenia doktora Antoniego Schneebergera dotyczące snu i czuwania żołnierzy". Lekarz Wojskowy 69, no. 7 (1993): 414-18.
 Konopka, S. "Antoni Schneeberger i jego dzieło o higienie wojskowej." Archiwum Historii Medycyny. XXVII, nos. 1-2 (1964): 49-54.
 Kośmiński, S. Słownik lekarzów polskich, pp. 445-46. Warszawa, 1888.
 Koźluk, M. and Sz. Sułecki. "Une petite perle de Cracovie: la bibliothèque médicale d’Anton Schneeberger (1530-1581)". Histoire des sciences médicales''. XLVI, no. 4 (2012): 441–52.
 Nierzwicki, Krzysztof. "Warszawski egzemplarz De humani corporis fabrica Andreasa Vesaliusa (Bazylea 1555) ze zbiorów Biblioteki Narodowej: Przyczynek do dziejów recepcji anatomii wesaliańskiej w Polsce."  
 Rostafiński, Józef. "Nasza literatura botaniczna XVI w oraz jej autorowie lub tłumacze". Cracow, 1888.
 Szostak, Jan. "Farmakognozja, farmacja galenowa i aptekarstwo w renesansowych zielnikach polskich". Warszawa, 2006.

1530 births
1581 deaths
16th-century Latin-language writers
16th-century Polish botanists
Polish male non-fiction writers
16th-century Polish physicians
Polish male writers
Swiss emigrants to Poland